The Congress Theatre is a Grade II* listed, purpose built, modern theatre and conference venue in the seaside town of Eastbourne, East Sussex. It is one of the largest theatres in southern England, with seating capacity of 1,689. The theatre was designed by Bryan and Norman Westwood Architects and built in 1963. The theatre underwent major refurbishment in 2019, to reveal a bright and contemporary look, whilst fully maintaining the character of the original design. Shows include touring West End theatre, ballet, opera, comedy and live music.

It was the location for the final recorded concert by the American pianist, composer and band leader Duke Ellington on 1 December 1973. Ellington died five months later in May 1974.

Facilities 
The theatre has a licensed bar, cloakroom facilities, disabled facilities (including an infrared system for the hard of hearing) and public phones (available in the foyer)

See also
Eastbourne Theatres
Listed buildings in Eastbourne

External links
 Eastbourne Theatres website

Theatres in Eastbourne
1963 establishments in England
Grade II* listed buildings in East Sussex